The Ulsan Metropolitan Council is the local council of Ulsan, South Korea.

There are a total of 22 members, with 19 members elected in the First-past-the-post voting system and 3 members elected in Party-list proportional representation.

Current composition 

The Ulsan Metropolitan Council has no regulations on the negotiation group.

Organization 
The structure of Council consists of:
Chairman
Two Vice-chairmen
Standing Committees
Steering Committee of Council
Administration and Autonomy Committee
Environment and Welfare Committee
Industry and Construction Committee
Education Committee
Special Committees
Special Committees on Budget and Accounts
Special Committees on Ethics

Recent election results

2018 

|- style="text-align:center;"
! rowspan="2" colspan="3" width="200" | Party
! colspan="4" | Constituency
! colspan="4" | Party list
! colspan="2" | Total seats
|- style="text-align:center;"
! width="60" | Votes
! width="40" | %
! width="40" | Seats
! width="32" | ±
! width="60" | Votes
! width="40" | %
! width="40" | Seats
! width="32" | ±
! width="40" | Seats
! width="32" | ±
|-
| width="1" style="background-color:" |
| style="text-align:left;" colspan=2| Democratic Party of Korea
| 277,409 || 46.95 || 15 || 15
| 281,772 || 47.00 || 2 || 1
| 17 || 16
|-
| width="1" style="background-color:" |
| style="text-align:left;" colspan=2| Liberty Korea Party
| 231,240 || 39.14 || 4 || 15
| 199,505 || 33.28 || 1 || 1
| 5 || 16
|-
| width="1" style="background-color:" |
| style="text-align:left;" colspan=2| Justice Party
| 3,366 || 0.57 || 0 || 0
| 38,680 || 6.45 || 0 || 0
| 0 || 0
|-
| width="1" style="background-color:" |
| style="text-align:left;" colspan=2| Minjung Party
| 52,159 || 8.83 || 0 || new
| 31,932 || 5.32 || 0 || new
| 0 || new
|-
| width="1" style="background-color:" |
| style="text-align:left;" colspan=2| Bareunmirae Party
| 3,597 || 0.61 || 0 || new
| 31,414 || 5.24 || 0 || new
| 0 || new
|-
| width="1" style="background-color:#DC143C" |
| style="text-align:left;" colspan=2| Labor Party
| 6,458 || 1.09 || 0 || 0
| 10,439 || 1.74 || 0 || 0
| 0 || 0
|-
| width="1" style="background-color:" |
| style="text-align:left;" colspan=2| Korean Patriots' Party
| colspan=4 
| 2,872 || 0.47 || 0 || new
| 0 || new
|-
| width="1" style="background-color:" |
| style="text-align:left;" colspan=2| Green Party Korea
| colspan=4 
| 2,824 || 0.47 || 0 || new
| 0 || new
|-
| width="1" style="background-color:grey" |
| style="text-align:left;" colspan=2| Other parties
| 679 || 0.11 || 0 || 0
| colspan=4 
| 0 || 0
|-
| width="1" style="background-color:" |
| style="text-align:left;" colspan=2| Independents
| 15,962 || 2.70 || 0 || 0
| colspan=4 
| 0 || 0
|-
|- style="background-color:#E9E9E9"
| colspan=3 style="text-align:center;" | Total
| 590,870 || 100.00 || 19 || –
| 599,438 || 100.00 || 3 || –
| 22 || –
|}

References 

Ulsan
Provincial councils of South Korea